The Devizes Guardians are a local political party based in Devizes, Wiltshire, England. The party was formed in 2001 and has been successful in winning seats on Kennet District Council and Wiltshire Council, but at present is represented only on Devizes Town Council, which from May 2013 it controls.

History
The Devizes Guardians were formed in 2001, in the aftermath of the felling of five London plane trees in the Devizes Market Place, and on 19 June 2002 the new party was registered with the Electoral Commission under the Registration of Political Parties Act 1998. On 18 July 2002 the Devizes Guardians contested and won a Kennet District Council by-election in the Devizes East ward, the successful candidate being Tony Duck, who commented "I think there is a movement for more grass roots representation, free from the shackles of party politics and hopefully enabling us to challenge local issues."

At the Kennet district elections of May 2003, the party contested three seats, all in Devizes, and won all three, its successful candidates being Nigel Carter (Devizes North), Jeffrey Ody (Devizes South), and Tony Duck (Devizes East). Carter commented to a Wiltshire newspaper "We have to acknowledge there is an element of protest vote in the support we have had. The question of the future of the hospital has been paramount in the issues expressed by the people we have talked to, with transport coming a close second."

At the May 2005 county council elections, the party contested two divisions of Wiltshire County Council, Devizes North and Devizes South, its candidates being Carter and Ody, but was unsuccessful in both.

In the Kennet District Council elections of May 2007, the Guardians won two seats (Ody and Duck being re-elected, but Carter being defeated) and also three on Devizes Town Council, to which Jane Burton, Ted East, and Peter Smith were elected. In that year, the party reported to the Electoral Commission that it had 56 members and that its income and expenditure were both under £2000.

On 1 April 2009, the District of Kennet was abolished as part of the 2009 structural changes to local government in England, and the Devizes Guardians contested four seats in the first elections to the new Wiltshire Council unitary authority held on 4 June 2009. Its three successful candidates were Ody (Devizes and Roundway South), Carter (Devizes North), and Jane Burton (Devizes East).

At an annual general meeting held on 27 October 2009, the party celebrated its successes and stressed the importance of a new public consultation on planning policy for Wiltshire.

At the local elections on 2 May 2013, the Devizes Guardians won more than half the seats on Devizes Town Council, nine out of seventeen, defeating candidates from all three major English parties. However, at the same time they lost all of their places on Wiltshire Council to the Conservatives.

The registered emblems of the party represent a tree, and it has been called the "local conservation party".

Officers
The party's registered officers are as follows:
Leader: Mr Nigel Carter
Nominating Officer: Mr Edward William East
Treasurer: Peter Corbett

Wiltshire Council elections, 2009

At the Wiltshire Council elections of 4 June 2009, the party contested four divisions and won three.

See also
Kennet local elections
2009 Wiltshire Council election
2013 Wiltshire Council election

References

External links

 Your Town Councillors at devizes-tc.gov.uk

Political parties established in 2001
Locally based political parties in England
Politics of Wiltshire
Devizes
2001 establishments in England